Machil fake encounter, also known as Machil encounter case, refers to a extrajudicial killing which was carried out by the Indian Army on 29 April 2010 by killing the three Kashmiri civilians Shazad Ahmad Khan (27), Shafi Ahmad Lone (19) and Riyaz Ahmad Lone (20) and labelled them as Pakistani militants. Considered as one of the biggest human rights abuses in Jammu and Kashmir since insurgency began in 1947 between India, Pakistan and China, the trio were killed in Machil area of Kupwara district, Jammu and Kashmir at the Line of Control (LoC).

It was widely covered by the news media and national and international human rights organizations, including Amnesty International as well as opposition and mainstream political parties, including the then ruling parties National Conference and the Indian National Congress. Machil fake encounter became the first case in the history of Jammu and Kashmir when army convicted its personnel for human rights violations in the territory.

Background 
On 29 April 2010, an army source, Bashir Ahmad Lone offered a job to the victims and promised ₹2000 earning a day. Lone was sent to them by another two army sources, Abdul Hamid and Abbas Ahmad. When the victims reached near LoC, army sources handed over them to 4 Rajputana Rifles at RS. 50,000 each and later they were killed in a fake encounter by Rajputana Rifles soldiers at the Line of Control and labelled them as Pakistani militants. 

The next day after killing the victims, the army issued a statement claiming they prevented infiltration attempted on the Line of Control by the three Pakistani-origin militants. It also claimed that they recovered weapons, including the 5 AK-47, ammunition and Pakistani currency from the militants. After the trio from Nadihal village suddenly disappeared, their families started searching for the victims but they returned with empty handed and later filed a missing report with a nearby police station.

The police investigation revealed that the trio were killed in a fake encounter after obtaining call detail records of the victims. According to police, trio were present in Thayen village, Kalaroos of Kupwara when they were killed in Machil area. The family of one of the victims, Riyaz stated that Bashir Ahmad Lone offered a good job opportunity to Riyaz at the border. Riyaz Ahmad Lone, 20 was working at a mechanical shop in Sopore while another victim, Shahzad Ahmed Khan, 27 was a fruit seller and Mohammad Shafi Lone, 19 was working as a laborer.

The victims left their homes on 27 April for a job meeting with Lone. However, they were asked to come after a some days. During the police interrogation, driver of the vehicle which was used by the army sources confessed that he took the trio from Nadihal village to Kupwara. After the victims were killed, army buried them in Machil, however Jammu and Kashmir Police played a central role and brought the bodies for burial in a local graveyard. The faces of the victims were painted with black colour after army labelled them militants.

Court martial 
When police revealed the background of the fake encounter, they filed a chargesheet against the 11 accused persons, including 9 army personnel and two civilians. The accused included a colonel and 2 majors. They were charged under sections 302 for murder, section 364 for abduction, section 120-B for criminal conspiracy and section 34 for common intent of the Ranbir Penal Code. The case was initially heard by the Sopore High Court chief judicial magistrate and issued a notice to the army asking to produce involved people before the police.

The army decline to follow the court orders, leading the local court to transfer it to the High Court of Jammu and Kashmir and Ladakh which ordered the army to setup an army court inquiry. The inquiry was started in December 2013 and the accused were sentenced life imprisonment in 2014 by the Summary General Court Martial (SGCM). The army confirmed the life imprisonment of convicted people on 7 September 2015. However, three army sources such as Abbas, Bashir and Hamid were acquitted by the court. It was first time in 25 years of insurgency in Jammu and Kashmir when army confirmed life imprisonment by the General Court Martial (GCM) for killing civilians.

Aftermath 

The killing of the trio was heavily criticised by the people which turned into an uprising which left 113 to 120 people dead with hundreds of people injured in different clashes with the Jammu and Kashmir police and the Central Reserve Police Force (CRPF).

Later development 
The Armed Forces Tribunal granted bail to 5 convicted army personnel and suspended their conviction in 2017. However, the then ruling party Jammu and Kashmir Peoples Democratic Party chief minister, Mehbooba Mufti's government didn't challenge the suspension of life imprisonment of the convicted army personnel.

See also 
2009 Shopian rape and murder case
Rape during the Kashmir conflict
2010 Kashmir unrest

References

Further reading 
 
 
 
 

People killed by armed forces
2010s in Jammu and Kashmir
Human rights abuses in Jammu and Kashmir
People murdered in Jammu and Kashmir